Rudolph the Red-Nosed Reindeer is a legendary Christmas character, originally from a booklet by Robert Lewis May.

Rudolph the Red-Nosed Reindeer may also refer to:
 Rudolph the Red-Nosed Reindeer (1948 film), an animated short by Max Fleischer
 "Rudolph the Red-Nosed Reindeer" (song), written by Johnny Marks, sung most famously by Gene Autry in 1949
 Rudolph the Red-Nosed Reindeer (TV special), 1964
 Rudolph the Red-Nosed Reindeer (soundtrack), from the special
 Rudolph the Red-Nosed Reindeer (video game), based on the special
 Rudolph the Red-Nosed Reindeer: The Movie, 1998

See also
 Rudolph (disambiguation)
 Red nose (disambiguation)
 Reindeer (disambiguation)